Lache is a housing estate in Chester, England.

Lache may also refer to:

Lache people, of central Colombia
Wilhelm Lache, Austrian luger
Lache Seastrunk (born 1991), American collegiate football running back
Lake Lacha or Lache, in Russia
Lache (Kinzig), a river in Hesse, Germany, tributary of the Kinzig

See also
Laches (disambiguation)